SuperSU is an Android application that can keep track of the root permissions of apps, after the Android device has been rooted.

SuperSU is generally installed through a custom recovery such as TWRP. SuperSU includes the option to undo the rooting. SuperSU cannot always reliably hide the rooting.

History 
In 2014, support for Android 5.0 was added.

In 2018, the application was removed from the Google Play Store.

In 2018, the original developer Chainfire announced their departure of SuperSU development, although others continue to maintain it.

Library 
The SuperSU project includes a wrapper library written in Java called libsuperuser for different ways of calling the su binary.

See also 
 Magisk

References

External links 
 

Android (operating system)